The Flyway Club is a historic shooting club at 221 Marsh Causeway in Knotts Island, North Carolina.  Located on more than  facing Currituck Sound on the west side of Knotts Island, it is one of the oldest surviving fowl hunting clubs in the state.  Its main lodge was built about 1920, and rebuilt in a near replica in 1960 after being destroyed by fire.  The lodge also includes a large U-shaped farm building, also built about 1920, that housed the club staff and farming equipment.  The club was established by Ogden Mills Reid, and remained in the Reid family until 2013, when it was acquired by the Conservation Fund.

Twenty-six acres of the club's property was listed on the National Register of Historic Places in 2015.

See also
National Register of Historic Places listings in Currituck County, North Carolina

References

Clubhouses on the National Register of Historic Places in North Carolina
Buildings and structures completed in 1920
Buildings and structures in Currituck County, North Carolina
National Register of Historic Places in Currituck County, North Carolina